Crveni Breg may refer to:
 Crveni Breg (Bela Palanka), a village in Bela Palanka, Serbia
 Crveni Breg (Leskovac), a village in Leskovac, Serbia